Harashim (lit. Craftsmen) is a community settlement in northern Israel. Located in the Upper Galilee to the north of Karmiel, it falls under the jurisdiction of Misgav Regional Council. Harashim is the wettest inhabited place in Israel.

History
The village was established in 1980 as part of the Galilee lookout plan to encourage Jewish settlement in the region. Its name is derived from nearby Tel Harashim, an Iron Age Jewish village where it is believed the inhabitants worked as blacksmiths.

Geography

Climate
Harashim has a Mediterranean climate (Köppen climate classification: Csa) with hot, dry summers and cool, rainy and occasionally snowy winters. The village receives  of precipitation per year. Winters are cool and wet, and precipitation is occasionally in the form of snow. Harashim is the wettest inhabited place in Israel.

References

Community settlements
Populated places established in 1980
Populated places in Northern District (Israel)
1980 establishments in Israel